Maxwell Garvie was a Scottish farmer and businessman who was murdered in 1968, in "one of the most infamous murders in Scottish criminal history".

The following year his wife, Sheila Garvie, and her lover, Brian Tevendale, were convicted of his murder after a sensational trial at the Aberdeen High Court, which included revelations about group sex and drugs. It was Tevendale who shot Maxwell with a rifle while he was asleep. Later Tevendale disposed of the body in a tunnel at Lauriston Castle, near St Cyrus.

The case against a third accused, Alan Peters, was found not proven.

While alive, Maxwell enjoyed a lascivious life. He was fond of female company and maintained physical relations with many. Tevendale's sister Trudy Birse was just one of them. Maxwell frequently arranged wild parties in his house which involved orgies. At first Sheila was not eager to take part, but her husband insisted and the latter won.

Sheila Garvie and Tevendale broke off contact shortly after the trial, they were both released in 1978.  Tevendale died in December 2003, whilst Garvie died from Alzheimer’s disease in 2014, aged 80.

See also 

 Mariticide

References

External links 
 "Murder at Kinky Cottage", By Reg McKay, 19 OCT 2007, Daily Record

Murder in Scotland
1967 in Scotland
High Court of Justiciary cases
1968 in British law
Mariticides
1967 murders in the United Kingdom